Marc Chapiteau (born 17 August 1946) is a French actor.

Selected filmography 
 La meilleure façon de marcher (1976)
 Julien Fontanes, magistrat (1987–88)
 Our Happy Lives (1999)
 Je te mangerais (2007)
 Blood from a Stone (2012)

External links
 

1946 births
Living people
French male film actors
French male television actors
French male stage actors
French male voice actors
Place of birth missing (living people)
20th-century French male actors